Cape Morton is a headland in North Greenland in Avannaata municipality. The cape is named after Arctic explorer William Morton, who surveyed the Nares Strait area together with Hans Hendrik in June 1854 during the Second Grinnell Expedition.

Fossils dating back to the Homerian have been found in the area of the cape. They belong to the Kap Morton Formation of the Peary Land Group.

Geography
Mushroom-shaped Joe Island lies 3.2 km from the shore west-north-west of the cape.

Together with Cape Baird on the eastern coast of Ellesmere Island this cape marks the northern limit of the Kennedy Channel and the entrance of the Hall Basin, both part of the Nares Strait.

See also
List of fossiliferous stratigraphic units in Greenland
Peary Land

References

External links
 The Second Thule Expedition to Northern Greenland, 1916-1918
 Weather forecast for Kap Morton, Qaasuitsup (Greenland)

Headlands of Greenland